Tadas Kumeliauskas (born 11 December 1990) is a Lithuanian professional ice hockey player for EV Landshut of the German DEL2.

Playing career
On 9 September 2013, Kumeliauskas signed a 1+1 deal with TPS of the Finnish Liiga debut playing with them during the 2013–14 Liiga season. On 14 January 2014, he extended his contract with the team.

On 8 July 2017, Kumeliauskas signed a tryout agreement with Dynamo Pardubice of Czech Extraliga. On 23 November 2017, he signed a four-game contract with Dresdner Eislöwen of the German DEL2. On 1 December 2017, his contract was extended. On 5 October 2018, Kumeliauskas signed with Saryarka Karagandy of the Supreme Hockey League (VHL). On 19 January 2019, Kumeliauskas signed with ECDC Memmingen of the German Oberliga.

Personal life
He is the brother of fellow ice hockey player Donatas Kumeliauskas.

References

External links
 

1990 births
Living people
Arystan Temirtau players
Dresdner Eislöwen players
HC TPS players
HK Liepājas Metalurgs players
Lithuanian ice hockey forwards
People from Elektrėnai
Saryarka Karagandy players